Mukdahan is a town (thesaban mueang) and capital of Mukdahan Province, which became Thailand's 73rd province in 1982. In the northern region of the country, on the right (west) bank Mekong River, it was formerly a district of Nakhon Phanom Province. The population of the municipal area was 180,600 in 2010. Mukdahan is 645 km northeast of Bangkok.

Etymology
The city was established at the mouth of Muk Creek and named Mukdahan from Kaeo Mukdahan, derived from the following:
Kaeo แก้ว noun or adjective: glass other than sheet glass; a glass, a tumbler; gem-like, precious, exquisite.
Muk มุก  noun: mother-of pearl; nacre.
Da ดา verb intransitive: to advance along a wide front
Han หาร verb intransitive or transitive: to divide; to be divided.

History
Prehistoric paintings and other archaeological discoveries show that the area of Mukdahan was the site of ancient communities. The modern history of the city begins late in the Ayutthaya Era (1350-1767). In the years 1767–1770, Prince Kinnari, son of Prince Suriwong, ruler in Ban Luang Phonsim of Savannakhét, established a settlement at the mouth of Muk Creek, across the Mekong from Savannakhét. In the reign of King Taksin, 1768–1782, Prince Kinnari received appointment as Phraya Chandara Sri Surat with a rank equivalent to viceroy. In 1893, Savannakhét District of Mukdahan was ceded to France.

Climate
Mukdahan has a tropical savanna climate (Köppen climate classification Aw). Winters are dry and warm. The monsoon season runs from late-April through early-October, with heavy rains and somewhat cooler temperatures during the day, although nights remain warm.

Second Thai-Lao Friendship Bridge
The Second Thai–Lao Friendship Bridge, across the Mekong to Savannakhet, Laos was completed in December 2006.

Ho Kaeo Mukdahan

Ho Kaeo Mukdahan, or Mukdahan Tower, is an observation tower 65.5 metres in height, constructed in 1996 to honor the 50th anniversary of the king's accession to the throne. 
1st Floor—Art and Culture Museum
2nd Floor—History and Culture of eight ethnic tribes of Mukdahan
Tai Kha
Tai Kha Soe
Tai Kha Lerng
Isan Peoples
Tai Yor
Tai Saek
Tai Kula
Phu Tai
3rd-5th Floors—Pillar of the tower
6th Floor—360° Observation deck
7th Floor—A silver Buddha image in the meditation position called Phra Buddhanavamingmongkol, and the Buddha image for each day of the week

References

External links

Populated places in Mukdahan province
Laos–Thailand border crossings
Populated places on the Mekong River
Cities and towns in Thailand
Isan